Tatalon is a barangay of Quezon City, Philippines. According to 2015 Census, it has a population of 63,129 people.

History

Tatalon was originally a part of Caloocan but it was carved out of the city in 1939 pursuant to Commonwealth Act 502, which created Quezon City as the capital of the Philippines, along with the following sitios and barrios: Balingasa, Kaingin, Kangkong, La Loma, Malamig, Matalahib, Masambong, San Isidro, San Jose and Santol.

Geography

Tatalon is one of the city's low-lying areas and is susceptible to flooding. The place is also prone to liquefaction.

References

Quezon City
Barangays of Quezon City
Barangays of Metro Manila
1939 establishments in the Philippines